Electric vehicle warning sounds are sounds designed to alert pedestrians to the presence of electric drive vehicles such as hybrid electric vehicles (HEVs), plug-in hybrid electric vehicles (PHEVs), and battery electric vehicles (BEVs) travelling at low speeds. Warning sound devices were deemed necessary by some government regulators because vehicles operating in all-electric mode produce less noise than traditional combustion engine vehicles and can make it more difficult for pedestrians and cyclists (especially the blind or short-sighted) to be aware of their presence. Warning sounds may be driver triggered (as in a horn but less urgent) or automatic at low speeds; in type, they vary from clearly artificial (beeps, chimes) to those that mimic engine sounds and those of tires moving over gravel.

Japan issued guidelines for such warning devices in January 2010 and the U.S. approved legislation in December 2010. In April 2014, the European Parliament approved legislation that requires the mandatory use of acoustic vehicle alerting systems (AVAS). Manufacturers must install an AVAS system in four-wheeled electric and hybrid electric vehicles that are approved from July 1, 2019, and to all new quiet electric and hybrid vehicles registered from July 2021. The vehicle must make a continuous noise level of at least 56 dBA (within 2 meters) if the car is going 20 km/h (12 mph) or slower, and a maximum of 75 dBA.

Several automakers have developed electric warning sound devices, and since December 2011 advanced technology cars available in the market with manually activated electric warning sounds include the Nissan Leaf,  Chevrolet Volt, Honda FCX Clarity, Nissan Fuga Hybrid/Infiniti M35, Hyundai Sonata Hybrid, and the Toyota Prius (Japan only). Models equipped with automatically activated systems include the 2014 BMW i3 (option not available in the US), 2012 model year Toyota Camry Hybrid, 2012 Lexus CT200h, all EV versions of the Honda Fit, and all Prius family cars recently introduced in the United States, including the standard 2012 model year Prius, the Toyota Prius v, Prius c and the Toyota Prius Plug-in Hybrid. The 2013 Smart electric drive, optionally, comes with automatically activated sounds in the U.S. and Japan and manually activated in Europe.

Background
As a result of increased sales of full electric vehicle and hybrid electric vehicles in several countries, some members of the blind community have raised concerns about the noise reduction when those vehicles operate in all-electric mode, as blind people or the visually impaired consider the noise of combustion engines a helpful aid while crossing streets and think quiet hybrids could pose an unexpected hazard. Although a 2009 study found no statistically significant difference in pedestrian crashes involving quiet hybrid vehicles when compared to noisier vehicles when both types of vehicles were travelling in a straight line, it found a doubling of hybrid vehicle pedestrian crashes when reversing or parking etc. at slow speeds.

This problem is not exclusive to electric vehicles. In 2007 research at the Technical University Munich showed that ordinary vehicles in background noise are often detected too late for safe accident avoidance. The researchers measured the distance at which vehicles approaching pedestrians became audible with minimal background noise. These distances were then compared to the stopping distances of the respective cars and an algorithm was proposed to estimate them based on auditory masking.

Research conducted at the University of California, Riverside in 2008 found that hybrid cars are so quiet when operating in electric mode (EV mode) that they may pose a risk to pedestrians and cyclists, especially the blind, children and the elderly, as they may have only one or two seconds, depending on the context, to audibly detect the location of approaching hybrid cars when the vehicles operate at very slow speeds. This research project was funded by the National Federation of the Blind.

Then test subjects in a laboratory listened to the recordings and indicated when they could hear from which direction the cars approached. In a second trial, the background sounds of two quietly idling combustion engine cars were added to the recordings to simulate the noise of a parking lot. Under this condition, the hybrid needed to be 74 percent closer than the conventional car before the subjects could hear from which direction the cars approached. This result means that under closer to normal environmental noise, a pedestrian would not be able to correctly determine the hybrid's approach until it was one second away.

Hybrid cars were also tested safe when moving off at traffic lights and it was found that under this condition they do not pose a risk to pedestrians. All Prius models used in the study engaged their internal combustion engines when accelerating from a standstill and produced enough noise to be detected.

A 2009 study conducted by the U.S. National Highway Traffic Safety Administration found that crashes involving pedestrians and bicyclists have higher incidence rates for hybrid electric vehicles than internal combustion engine (ICE) vehicles in low-speed vehicle manoeuvres such as reversing or leaving a parking zone. These accidents commonly occurred in zones with low speed limits, during daytime and in clear weather. The study found that a HEV was two times more likely to be involved in a pedestrian crash than was a conventional ICE vehicle when a vehicle is slowing or stopping, backing up, or entering or leaving a parking space. Vehicle manoeuvres were grouped in one category considering those manoeuvres that might have occurred at very low speeds where the difference between the sound levels produced by the hybrid versus ICE vehicle is the greatest. Also the study found that the incidence rate of pedestrian crashes in scenarios when vehicles make a turn was significantly higher for HEVs when compared to ICE vehicles. Similarly, The NHTSA study also concluded that the incidence rate of bicyclist crashes involving HEVs for the same kind of manoeuvres was significantly higher when compared to conventional vehicles.

In September 2010, Volvo Cars and Vattenfall, a Swedish energy company, issued a report regarding the results of the first phase of the Volvo V70 Plug-in Hybrid demonstration program. Among other findings, before the trial drivers participating in the field testing were concerned about being a danger to pedestrians and cyclists due to the quietness of the electric-drive vehicle. After the test several of them changed their opinion and said that this issue was less of a problem than they expected. Nevertheless, some test drivers said they experienced incidents of not being noticed while others said they had taken extra care in their driving with regard to this issue.

Regulations
Since 2009 the Japanese government, the U.S. Congress and the European Commission are exploring legislation to establish a minimum level of sound for plug-in electric and hybrid electric vehicles when operating in electric mode, so that blind people and other pedestrians and cyclists can hear them coming and detect from which direction they are approaching. Tests have shown that vehicles operating in electric mode can be particularly hard to hear below .

European Union
In 2011 the European Commission drafted a guideline for acoustic vehicle alerting systems (AVAS). The goal is to present recommendations to manufacturers for a system to be installed in vehicles to provide an audible signal to pedestrians and vulnerable road users. This interim guideline is intended to provide guidance until the completion of on-going research activities and the development of globally harmonised device performance specifications. The guidelines are intended for hybrid electric and pure electric highway-capable vehicles. It also states that the AVAS may have a pause switch to stop its operation temporarily.

On 6 February 2013, the European Parliament approved a draft law to tighten noise limits for cars to protect public health, and also to add alerting sounds to ensure the audibility of hybrid and electric vehicles to improve the safety of vulnerable road users in urban areas, such as blind, visually and auditorily challenged pedestrians, cyclists and children. The draft legislation states a number of tests, standards and measures that must first be developed for acoustic vehicle alerting systems (AVAS) to be compulsory in the future. Now an agreement has to be negotiated with European Union countries. The approved amendment establishes that "the sound to be generated by the AVAS should be a continuous sound that provides information to the pedestrians and vulnerable road users of a vehicle in operation. The sound should be easily indicative of vehicle behaviour and should sound similar to the sound of a vehicle of the same category equipped with an internal combustion engine." In April 2014 the European Parliament approved the legislation (Regulation (EU) No 540/2014) that requires the acoustic vehicle alerting systems, which is mandatory for all new electric and hybrid electric vehicles. The new rule established a transitional period of 5 years after publication of the final approval of the April 2014 proposal to comply with the regulation.

Japan
Beginning in July 2009 the Japanese government began assessing possible countermeasures through the Committee for the Consideration of Countermeasures Regarding Quiet Hybrid and Other Vehicles, and in January 2010 the Ministry of Land, Infrastructure, Transport and Tourism issued guidelines for hybrid and other near-silent vehicles.

China 
Beginning in December 2018, the Chinese government explored guidelines regarding an acoustic vehicle alerting system of electric vehicles running at low speed, and implemented them in September 2019.

United Kingdom
The Department for Transport (DfT) commissioned research to gather statistics on accidents involving electric vehicles with pedestrians who are blind or vision impaired to determine whether the perceived accident risk is real and whether electric and hybrid cars are more difficult to detect audibly than conventional internal combustion engine vehicles. The DfT goal was to use the findings to establish what sort of sound should be fitted to electric vehicles.

The research was conducted by the Transport Research Laboratory, and the findings were published in 2011. The study found little correlation between the rate of accidents with pedestrians and noise level for the majority of vehicles. A previous study did not find an increased pedestrian accident rate for electric and hybrid vehicles with respect to their conventional counterparts, which raised the question as to whether added sound is necessarily required. The study also noted that some modern conventional cars are as quiet as their electric counterparts, even at low speeds.

UK organisation The Guide Dogs for the Blind Association lobbied members of the European Parliament to vote in favour of legislation to make the installation of artificial sound generators mandatory on quiet electric and hybrid vehicles.

United States
The Pedestrian Safety Enhancement Act of 2010 was approved by the U.S. Senate by unanimous consent on December 9, 2010 and passed by the House of Representatives by 379 to 30 on December 16, 2010. The act does not stipulate a specific speed for the simulated noise but requires the U.S. Department of Transportation to study and establish a motor vehicle safety standard that would set requirements for an alert sound that allows blind and other pedestrians to reasonably detect a nearby electric or hybrid vehicle, and the ruling must be finalised within eighteen months. The bill was signed into law by President Barack Obama on January 4, 2011.

A proposed rule was published for comment by the National Highway Traffic Safety Administration (NHTSA) in January, 2013. The agency selected 30 km/h as the limit because, according to NHTSA measurements, this is the speed at which the sound levels of the hybrid and electric vehicles are approximately equivalent to the sound levels produced by similar internal combustion vehicles. According to the NHTSA proposal, car manufacturers would be able to pick the sounds the vehicles make from a range of choices, and similar vehicles would have to make the same sounds. The rules were scheduled to go into effect in September 2014. The NHTSA estimates that the new warning noises would prevent 2,800 pedestrian and cyclist injuries during the life of each model year electric and hybrid vehicle.

In February 2013, the Association of Global Automakers and the Alliance of Automobile Manufacturers, which submitted a joint comment to the NHTSA, announced their support to the rule, but asked the NHTSA to find a noise level that effectively alerts pedestrians without being excessively loud to others inside and outside of the vehicle. They also commented that the rule is too complicated, unnecessarily prescriptive, and it will cost more than necessary. Some automakers also said there is no need for electric-drive vehicles to play sounds while not in motion, "since it is not clear that it helps pedestrians to hear cars that are stopped in traffic or parked." In addition, the vehicle manufacturers requested the NHTSA to make the new sound system required by 2018 instead of 2014.

In January 2015, the NHTSA rescheduled the date for a final ruling to the end of 2015. Since the regulation comes into force three years after being rendered as a final rule, compliance was delayed to 2018. In November 2015, the NHTSA rescheduled one more time because additional coordination was necessary. A final ruling was delayed at least until mid-March 2016. After several additional delays, the National Highway Traffic Safety Administration issued its final ruling in February 2018. The regulation requires full compliance in September 2020, but 50% of "quiet" vehicles must have the warning sounds by September 2019.

Specific systems

Enhanced Vehicle Acoustics
Enhanced Vehicle Acoustics (EVA), a company based in Silicon Valley, California and founded by two Stanford students with the help of seed money from the National Federation of the Blind, developed an after market technology called "Vehicular Operations Sound Emitting Systems" (VOSES). The device makes hybrid electric vehicles sound more like conventional internal combustion engine cars when the vehicle goes into the silent electric mode (EV mode), but at a fraction of the sound level of most vehicles. The system also shuts off when the hybrid combustion engine is active.

VOSES uses miniature, all-weather audio speakers that are placed on the hybrid's wheel wells and emit specific sounds based on the direction the car is moving in order to minimize noise pollution and to maximize acoustic information for pedestrians. If the car is moving forward, the sounds are only projected in the forward direction; and if the car is turning left or right, the sound changes on the left or right appropriately. The company argues that "chirps, beeps and alarms are more distracting than useful", and that the best sounds for alerting pedestrians are car-like, such as "the soft purr of an engine or the slow roll of tires across pavement." One of the EVA's external sound systems was designed specifically for the Toyota Prius.

ECTunes
ECTunes is developing a system that utilises directional sound equipment to emit noise when and where it is needed. According to the company, its technology sends audible signals only in the direction of travel, thus allowing the vehicle to be heard by those who may be in the car's path, without disturbing others with unwelcome noise. Insero Horsens, a Danish venture company, has provided a significant investment to help ECTunes fully develop its technology. 

The ECTunes system, and most others so far disclosed, use a control box, with software, digital amplifiers and weather-friendly external speakers. ECTunes' system connects to the car and reads speed and acceleration, shutting down when the car reaches Cross-over speed as set by existing regulation as well as regulation under development such as Quiet Road Transport Vehicles (QRTV), at which point the tires and wind are making noise of their own. The company is currently selling products to OEMs, mainly small series production, and to the after market, and has also a new mass production unit in prototype stage  The company ceased operations in 2016.

SoundRacer EVS
SoundRacer AB is a Swedish manufacturer of electronic engine sound devices established in 2008 to develop sound technology for internal combustion engine (ICE) cars. In 2012 the company released their first version of an Electric Vehicle Electronic Engine Sound System, based on the same technology.

SoundRacer EVS uses real engine sound recordings as the base for the sounds, following the legislation guidelines that the sound "should sound similar to the sound of a vehicle of the same category equipped with an internal combustion engine". As a result, the sounds will also be less likely to cause disturbance compared to adding new types of synthetic sounds into the traffic environment.

The sound modules are developed to give a realistic ICE sound impression indicating if the vehicle is idling, accelerating, decelerating or cruising. The different sound characters and sound volume is determined from information about the actual speed of the vehicle and speed change.

The company targets two different applications with the products: to make electric vehicles meet the AVAS legislations, and to increase driving experience to make electric vehicles more popular among customer groups that enjoy real engine sounds.
Currently (2022) the system is factory installed for AVAS in Rimac Nevera, Solaris Bus and other electric vehicles.

Many manufacturers of electric vehicles like cars, trucks and buses are now in the process of evaluating sound systems for their products. To assist them in the prototyping process, the SoundRacer EVS modules have functions that will give EV manufacturers the tools to test different sounds and settings. Several files with sounds and parameter settings, such as the speed for muting the sound, sound levels and simulated gear changing, can be created with a computer program and stored on a MicroSD card. Changing sounds and settings during test drives is then performed with a touch of a button. 
 
SoundRacer AB delivers complete systems with recorded engine sounds from cars and motorcycles, including standard 4-cylinder, big diesel truck, V8, V12 and V-Twin, CAN bus, analog and digital speed/rpm input and weather protected speakers. The system is tested and verified to meet the requirements for use in electric vehicles and make them fulfill the AVAS legislation. UNECE Regulation 10, REGULATION (EU) 2017/1576, UN Regulation 138, Annex VIII to Regulation (EU) No 540/2014.  Manufacturer certificates ISO 9001 and ISO 14001.

Fisker Automotive

Fisker Automotive developed a sound-generator that was incorporated in its Fisker Karma luxury plug-in hybrid electric vehicle, released in 2011. According to the car manufacturer, the sound is designed to both alert pedestrians and enhance the driver experience, and the warning noise will be emitted automatically. The Fisker Karma emits a sound through a pair of external speakers embedded in the bumper. According to a company spokesman the sound is a mix between a "Formula One car and a starship".

The developing process took between nine months to a year, and three sound companies sent in synthesised WAV file samples that were evaluated by Fisker employees and executives. The prospective sounds were studied in an audio chamber to allow engineers to evaluate the sounds without other noise interfering. After testing the candidate sounds in different locations relative to the vehicle, Fisker fine-tuned the final sound with its own equipment.

Ford
The 2012 Ford Focus Electric was planned to include warning sounds for pedestrians. Ford Motor Company developed four alternative sounds, and in June 2011 involved the electric car fans by asking them to pick their favorite from the four potential warning sounds through the Focus Electric Facebook page. However, ultimately Ford decided to hold off including warning sounds unless federal legislation required it, and no such system was implemented on the production vehicle.

General Motors
General Motors' first commercially available plug-in hybrid electric vehicle, the Chevrolet Volt, introduced in December 2010, includes warning sounds for pedestrians. GM's system is called Pedestrian-Friendly Alert System and it is manually activated by the driver, but future generations will probably include an active system. The automaker conducted a test with a group of the visually challenged at Milford Proving Grounds in order to evaluate the audible warning systems on the Volt when a pedestrian is in the car's proximity. The system uses the car's horn to emit a series of warning chirps, like a low tone of a horn, enough to provide an alert but not to startle. According to GM engineers, the biggest challenge is "developing an active system that can distinguish a pedestrian from another vehicle"; otherwise, the sound will go off frequently, producing noise pollution instead.

Hyundai
Hyundai developed a warning noise called the Virtual Engine Sound System (VESS). The system, which was introduced in September 2010 on its test fleet of BlueOn electric hatchbacks, provides synthetic audio feedback mimicking the sound of an idling internal combustion engine.

The 2011 Hyundai Sonata Hybrid is the first mass production car manufactured by Hyundai to include the warning sound system. In 2010 the car manufacturer decided to have a button on the Sonata Hybrid's instrument panel to turn the VESS on and off, but after the enactment of the Pedestrian Safety Enhancement Act of 2010, signed into law by President Obama in early 2011, and learning that the U.S. National Highway Traffic Safety Administration would not allow such switches to avoid the noise device to be turned off, Hyundai decided not to install the button, and the first Sonata Hybrids destined for the U.S. market had to be altered to remove the switch.

Kia 
Kia Niro HEV models sold in the US and UK in 2020/21 have been highly criticised by owners for the loud and antisocial reversing alert sounds, which can be heard from many 100s of feet away and yet are emitted from the front of the car.

Lotus Engineering
Lotus Engineering, a consultancy group of British sports car manufacturer Lotus Cars, partnered in 2009 with Harman Becker, a producer of audio systems, to develop and commercialise a synthetic automotive audio systems. Lotus has worked on a number of hybrid and electric vehicles and its engineers thought they would be safer if these vehicles made a noise while moving around the factory. Originally developed to cancel out intrusive noises inside a car, the noise cancelling system was adapted so that it could also simulate engine sounds that change with speed and use of the throttle, providing audible "feedback" to drivers of vehicles with a silent engine. At the same time, and through the addition of external speakers, the sound system allows pedestrians to hear the noise too, but optionally there can be a different sound within the car from the one that is emitted for the outside. Lotus used a Toyota Prius to demonstrate the device but did not indicate if it intended to bring this technology to market.

Lotus' synthetic sound system was incorporated in the Lotus Evora 414E Hybrid, a concept plug-in hybrid unveiled at the 2010 Geneva Motor Show. The system, called HALOsonic Internal and External Electronic Sound Synthesis, is a suite of noise solutions that uses patented technologies from Lotus and Harman International. The audio system generates engine sounds inside the vehicle through the audio system. The system also generates the external sound through speakers mounted at the front and rear to provide a warning to increase pedestrian safety. The system comes with four driver-selectable engine sounds, two of which have been designed to have characteristics of a multi-cylinder conventional V6 and V12 engine.

Nissan

Vehicle Sound for Pedestrians or VSP is a Nissan-developed warning sound system in electric vehicles. The Nissan Leaf was the first car manufactured by Nissan to include VSP, and the electric car includes one sound for forward motion and another for reverse. The VSP was also used in the Nissan Fuga hybrid launched in 2011. The system developed makes a noise easy to hear for pedestrians to be aware of the vehicle approaching, but the warning sounds do not distract the car occupants inside. Nissan explained that during the development of the sound they studied behavioural research of the visually impaired and worked with cognitive and acoustic psychologists, including the National Federation of the Blind, the Detroit Institute of Ophthalmology, experts from the Vanderbilt University Medical Center and a Hollywood sound design studio.

Nissan's Vehicle Sound for Pedestrians is a sine-wave sound system that sweeps from 2.5 kHz at the high end to a low of 600 Hz, a range that is easily audible across age groups. Depending on the speed and whether the Leaf is accelerating or decelerating, the sound system will make sweeping, high-low sounds. For example, when the Leaf is started the sound will be louder, and when the car is in reverse, the system will generate an intermittent sound. The sound system ceases operation when the Nissan Leaf reaches  and engages again as the car slows to under . For the 2011 Leaf, the driver could turn off sounds temporarily through a switch inside the vehicle, but the system automatically reset to "On" at the next ignition cycle. The system is controlled through a computer and synthesizer in the dash panel, and the sound is delivered through a speaker in the front driver's side wheel well.  Nissan said that there were six or seven finalist sounds, and that sound testing included driving cars emitting various sounds past testers standing on street corners, who indicated when they first heard the approaching car. Nissan removed the ability to disable the pedestrian alert between model year 2011 and 2012 in anticipation of the U.S. ruling to be issued by the National Highway Traffic Safety Administration.

After Nissan's new sounds were publicised, the U.S. National Federation of the Blind issued a statement saying that "while it was pleased that the alert existed, it was unhappy that the driver was able to turn it off." The NFB approves the Nissan Leaf's forward motion sound, but it said the forward noise should also be used for reversing because the "intermittent sound is not as effective as a continuous sound" and that the car should emit warning sounds when it is idling, not only when it's moving slowly. Nevertheless, their main complaint is that they don't think the driver should be able to switch the sound off.

The Leaf's electric warning sound had to be removed for cars delivered in the U.K., as the country's law mandates that any hazard warning sound must be capable of being disabled between 11:00 pm and 6:00 am, and the Leaf's audible warning system does not allow for such temporary deactivation. For the 2014 UK model of the car, the VSP system is enabled by default, though a button on the dash permits drivers to disable the system until the next time the car is switched on.

Tesla
Tesla, Inc. introduced a Pedestrian Warning System feature in September 2019 that emits warning sounds when the vehicle is traveling below 19mph/32km/h.  In 2021 Tesla announced plans to retrofit the system onto select older Model 3 and Model Y vehicles from 2019.  The feature is currently available on all Tesla models: Tesla Model S, Tesla Model 3, Tesla Model X, and Tesla Model Y.

Toyota

Toyota Motor Company teamed up with Fujitsu Ten to develop an automatic warning system for hybrids and electric vehicles to alert pedestrians when the car is propelled by its electric motor. The companies also studied the development of a system that would change the alarm's tune and volume with the assistance of an obstacle-detection radar.

The alert sound rises and falls in pitch according to the vehicle's speed, thus helping indicate the vehicle's proximity and movement to nearby pedestrians. Toyota is planning to use other versions of the device for use in hybrid electric vehicles, plug-in hybrids, electric vehicles as well as fuel-cell hybrid vehicles planned for mass production. The device meets the 2010 government regulations issued for hybrid and other near-silent vehicles.

Toyota's Vehicle Proximity Notification System (VPNS) was introduced in the United States in all 2012 model year Prius family vehicles, including the Prius v, Prius Plug-in Hybrid and the standard Prius. The system is being introduced to comply with the Pedestrian Safety Enhancement Act of 2010.

Volkswagen
Volkswagen offers a so-called e-Sound module on its electric and hybrid vehicles such as the e-Up, e-Golf and the GTE hybrid range. It provides a pedestrian warning sound up to 30 km/h.

Other manufacturers
Think Global, a manufactures of electric cars already in the market, is assessing this safety issue. Ford Motor Company is developing a system for emitting external sounds to future hybrids and electrics, including its Focus BEV, scheduled for 2011, and a next-generation hybrid and plug-in hybrid vehicle planned for 2012. Nancy Gioia, Ford's Director for Global Electrification commented that "car companies should consider standardising tones from future hybrids and electrics to avoid a cacophony of confusion on the streets."

Criticism and controversy
Several anti-noise and electric car advocates have opposed the introduction of artificial sounds as warning for pedestrians, as they argue that the proposed system will only increase noise pollution. They also opposed U.S. pending legislation that would require generated warning sounds with no off switch for the driver.

Robert S. Wall Emerson of Western Michigan University has argued that several high-end gasoline-powered luxury cars are already quieter than hybrids, and according to his most recent studies, hybrid SUVs were noisier than many internal-combustion vehicles. He concludes that pedestrian safety is not a hybrid issue but rather "a quiet car issue."

Market availability
, most of the hybrids and plug-in electric and hybrids sold make warning noises using a speaker system. Tesla Motors, Volkswagen and BMW do not currently include warning sounds in their electric-drive vehicles, as all of them decided to add artificial sounds only when required by regulation.

See also
Noise pollution
Back-up beeper
Advanced driver-assistance systems
Active sound design
Road traffic safety
Traffic psychology
Red flag traffic laws
Electromagnetically induced acoustic noise and vibration

References

External links
Text of S. 841 - 111th: Pedestrian Safety Enhancement Act of 2010 - Signed Jan 2011
Test of U.S. Federal Motor Vehicle Safety Standard No. 141: Minimum Sound Requirements for Hybrid and Electric Vehicles, NHTSA (November 2016)
Incidence of Pedestrian and Bicyclist Crashes by Hybrid Electric Passenger Vehicles, NHTSA (2009)
 Sample sounds for the proposed U.S. ruling, NHTSA (2013)
 Regulation (EU) No 540/2014 of the European Parliament and of the Council of 16 April 2014 on the sound level of motor vehicles and of replacement silencing systems
Check info of any vehicle by VIN number

Videos with demos of warning sounds
Chevrolet Volt Pedestrian Friendly Alert System
Lotus and Harman HALOsonic - Prius demonstrator
Nissan Vehicle Sound for Pedestrians (VSP)
Toyota Prius Approaching Vehicle Audible System
Toyota Prius Vehicle Proximity Notification System (VPNS)
Z-Audio marketplace for sound creation 

Electric vehicle technologies
Warning systems
Human–machine interaction
Sound production